Joseph Ngorialuk is a paralympic athlete from Kenya competing mainly in category T13 distance events.

Joseph competed in both the Marathon and 5000m at the 2004 Summer Paralympics winning the gold medal in the shorter distance.

References

Paralympic athletes of Kenya
Athletes (track and field) at the 2004 Summer Paralympics
Paralympic gold medalists for Kenya
Living people
Medalists at the 2004 Summer Paralympics
Year of birth missing (living people)
Place of birth missing (living people)
Paralympic medalists in athletics (track and field)
Kenyan male long-distance runners